Sir Robert Wright (c. 1634 – 1689) was an English judge and Chief Justice of the King’s Bench 1687–89.

Early life
Wright was the son of Jermyn Wright of Wangford in Suffolk, by his wife Anne, daughter of Richard Batchcroft of Bexwell in Norfolk. He was descended from a family long seated at Kilverstone, also known as Kelverstone, in Norfolk, and was educated at the free school at Thetford. He was admitted to Caius College, Cambridge on 1 April 1651.

Early legal career
He entered Lincoln's Inn on 14 June 1654, and after being called to the bar went the Norfolk circuit. According to Roger North he was "a comely person, airy and nourishing both in his habits and way of living", but a very poor lawyer. He was a friend of Roger's brother, Francis North, and relied implicitly on him when required to give a written opinion (North later developed a deep contempt for Wright). Although by marrying the daughter of the Bishop of Ely he obtained a good practice, his "voluptuous unthinking course of life" led him into great embarrassments. These he evaded by pledging his estate to Francis North, and afterwards mortgaging it to Sir Walter Plummer, fraudulently tendering him an affidavit that it was clear of all encumbrances.

On 10 April 1668 Wright was returned to parliament for King's Lynn. In 1678 he was appointed counsel for the University of Cambridge, and in August 1679 he was elected deputy recorder of the town. In October 1678 he fell under suspicion of being concerned in the Popish Plot, Edward Coleman, one of the supposed ringleaders of the Plot, having been in his company the Sunday before he was committed to Newgate. On 31 October the matter was brought by the Speaker before the House of Commons, which ordered Wright’s chambers in Lincoln's Inn and his lodgings to be searched. As nothing was found to incriminate him, he was declared completely exculpated. In Easter 1679 he was made a Serjeant, and on 12 May 1680 he was made a King's Serjeant. He was knighted on 15 May, and in 1681 was appointed chief justice of Glamorgan.

At this time his fortunes were at low ebb. He had made the acquaintance of Jeffreys, and had acquired his regard, it is said, by his ability as a mimic. He went to him and implored his assistance. Jeffreys had recourse to the king, and in spite of the vehement objections of Francis North, Lord Keeper of the Great Seal, who described him as ignorant, dishonest and utterly unfit to be a judge, procured his nomination on 27 Oct. 1684 as a Baron of the Exchequer. On 10 Feb. 1684-5 he was elected Recorder of Cambridge. James II selected him to accompany Jeffreys on the western assize after Monmouth's rebellion, and on his return removed him on 11 Oct. to the King's Bench. In 1686, in the case of Sir Edward Hales, Wright gave an opinion in favour of the dispensing power, when consulted by Sir Edward Herbert, previous to judgment being given in court in favour of Hales.

Chief Justice
On 6 April 1687 he was promoted to the chief-justiceship of the Common Pleas on the death of Sir Henry Bedingfield. This office he held only five days, for Herbert, having refused to assist the king to establish martial law in the army in time of peace by countenancing the execution of a deserter, was transferred to the chief-justiceship of the Common Pleas. Wright, who took his place as Chief Justice of the King's Bench, hanged deserters without hesitation. He gave further proof of his zeal by fining the Earl of Devonshire, an opponent of the court, the sum of £30,000 for assaulting Colonel Thomas Colepeper in the Vane chamber at Whitehall while the king and queen were in the presence, overruling his plea of privilege, and committing him to prison until the fine was paid. Wright accompanied the sentence with the remark that the offence was ' next door to pulling the king off his throne.'

In October 1687 Wright was sent to Oxford as an ecclesiastical commissioner with Thomas Cartwright (1634–1689) and Sir Thomas Jenner on the famous visitation of Magdalen College, Oxford when all the fellows but three were expelled for resisting the royal authority, and declared incapable of holding any ecclesiastical preferment. When the president of Magdalen, John Hough, protested against the proceedings of the commission, Wright declared that he would uphold his majesty's authority while he had breath in his body, and bound him over in a thousand pounds to appear before the king's bench on the charge of breaking the peace.

On 29 June 1688 Wright presided at the trial of the Seven Bishops. Although he so far accommodated himself to the king as to declare their petition a libel, he was overawed during the trial by the general voice of opinion and the apprehension of an indictment. In the words of a bystander "he looked as if all the peers present had halters in their pockets". He conducted the proceedings with decency and impartiality, apart from his obvious antipathy to the Solicitor General, William Williams, whom he accused, irrelevantly, of taking bribes. At an early stage the evidence of publication broke down, and Wright was about to direct the jury to acquit the prisoners when the prosecution was saved by the testimony of Sunderland. In his charge, while declaring in favour of the right of the subject to petition, he gave it as his opinion that the particular petition before the court was improperly worded, and was, in the contemplation of the law, a libel. He failed, however, to pronounce definitely in favour of the dispensing power of the crown. For this omission, his dismissal was afterwards contemplated, and he was probably saved by the difficulty of finding a successor.

In December 1688 the Prince of Orange caused two impeachments of high treason against Jeffreys and Wright to be printed at Exeter. Wright was accused among other offences of taking bribes "to that degree of corruption as is a shame to any court of justice". He continued to sit in court until the flight of James on 11 Dec. He then sought safety in concealment, and on 10 Jan. 1688-9 addressed a supplicating letter to the Earl of Danby asserting that he had always opposed popery, and had been compelled to act against his inclinations. His hiding-place in the Old Bailey  was discovered by Sir William Waller (d. 1699) on 13 February, and he was taken before Sir John Chapman, the Lord Mayor of London, who committed him to Newgate on the charge that, "being one of the judges of the Court of King's Bench, he had endeavoured the subversion of the established government by alloweing of a 
power to dispence with the laws; and that hee was one of the commissioners for ecclesiastical affairs."  On 6 May he was brought before the House of Lords for his action in regard to the Earl of Devonshire: but, although his overruling the earl's plea of privilege and committing him to prison was declared a manifest breach of privilege of parliament, no further action was taken against him. On 18 May he died of fever in Newgate. In the debate on the act of indemnity on 18 June, it was determined to except him from the act in spite of his decease. His name, however, does not appear in the final draft of the act.

Family life
Wright married three times. His first wife was Dorothy Moor of Wiggenhall St. Germans in Norfolk. She died in 1662 without issue, and he married, secondly, Susan (b. St. Giles in the Fields, London, 25 January 1633), daughter of Matthew Wren, Bishop of Ely; and thirdly, Anne, daughter of Sir William Scroggs, Lord Chief Justice of England, on 4 April 1681 at South Weald in Essex. The Manor of South Weald was sold in 1668 to Sir William Scroggs, Lord Chief Justice. He died in 1683 and was succeeded by his son William, who in 1685 sold the South Weald estate. By his second wife he had four daughters and one son, Robert (1666 – 12 October 1739), Chief Justice of the Province of South Carolina, father of Sir James Wright, Jermyn (c.1712 – 10 January 1799) and Isabella (c.1702 – 15 December 1775), his eldest daughter who married 1) James Graeme (d. 29 August 1752), also Chief Justice of the Province of South Carolina and 2) Dr. Thomas Glen, the brother of James Glen, Royal Governor of South Carolina, on 18 September 1755 at St. George's Hanover Square Church, London, Westminster, England. He also had issue by his third wife. His portrait was painted by John Riley in 1687 and engraved by Robert White.

By his second wife, Susan Wren, he had the following daughters:

 Susan (21 April 1664 – 1730), m. to Vertue Radford (18 January 1657/8 – 1694), Recorder of London, Esq. of Gray's Inn, on 25 May 1687 at Westminster Abbey. He was of Wilbarton in the Isle of Ely, and died at Ipswich in 1694. Vertue Radford was the second but eldest surviving son of the Reverend William Radford, by Anne his wife, and was born on 18 January and baptised at Richmond in Surrey on 22 January 1657/8. He was admitted to Gray's Inn on 19 November 1684. He was first married, on about 13 January 1678/9, when their marriage license is dated, to Jane, third daughter of John Everson, of London, Merchant, who died in childbed of her second daughter and was buried at Richmond 7 October 1681. Susan was born on 21 and baptised on 27 April 1664 at Ely Chapel. She was buried at the Church of St. Edmund in Sedgefield on 12 April 1730. Their only son Robert, who was baptised at St. Paul's, Covent Garden, on 7 August 1688, died at Eton, while a scholar there.
 Anne (d.1731), m. to Freville Lambton (8 January 1661/2 – 1731),  Esq. of Hardwick, Durham, by license dated 29 January 1694/5. They had the sons Robert Lambton (baptised 13 January 1695/6), William Lambton (baptised 7 February 1696/7), Henry Lambton (baptised 22 May 1698), Robert Lambton (baptised 20 November 1699), John Lambton (baptised 7 November 1700), Charles Lambton or Wright Lambton (baptised 16 December 1701 – buried 14 May 1789 at St. Andrew's, Newcastle-on-Tyne), who had John Lambton and a daughter, Mary, married to Jacob Lambert of Newcastle-on-Tyne, Edward Lambton (baptised 30 December 1702), George Lambton (baptised 23 March 1703/4), Richard Lambton (baptised 30 May 1705) and Theophilus Lambton (baptised 1 October 1706).
Elizabeth (d.1753), m. to John Rugge (d.1720), gentleman, of the Inner Temple, London and Stirtloe, Buckden, Huntingdonshire. He was the nephew of the diarist Thomas Rugge, and belonged to the same Rugge family as William Rugge, Bishop of Norwich. Their marriage settlement is dated 30 July/1 August 1692. John Rugge was buried at Temple Church on Monday 28 November 1720. Elizabeth writes in her will that if she if dies in or near London that she wanted to be 'buried in the Temple Church Yard in or near my dear husbands Grave'. She got her wish and was buried beside him on Wednesday 31 October 1753. Elizabeth is mentioned in no less than three family wills as being assigned important tasks of the type usually given to dependable and trustworthy people. She was left the cedar chest in her lodgings with the glass doors, the pendulum clock and ten pounds in ready money, by her cousin and brother-in-law John Ball (d.1732), in consideration for her care and trouble in receiving and paying his rents. In her will she gives to 'my faithful Servant Ann Rainsford' thirty pounds and what is needed to furnish a room for her to live in. After itemising a list of goods worthy of a duchess – amongst others one eating table, a tea table, a Dutch table, six chairs, a tea pot, a tea tray, six China tea cups and saucers, three or four tea spoons, a sugar dish, a tea kettle, a milk pot, a brass pottage pot, a large sauce pan, a small sauce pan, a frying pan, a coffee pot, a gridiron, a fire grate shovel, a pair of brass candlesticks, a cooking glass, a hollow flatiron with heaters, four devotional works, amongst them Dr. Stanhope's St. Austin's Meditations and Robert Nelson's A Companion for the Festivals and Fasts of the Church of England, a large silver spoon, eight strong good shifts, six good aprons, as many neckhandkerchiefs and six good suits of mobbs, and all her clothes apart from her black Robe à la Française, her light grey lutestring – a fine, glossy silk – and her stitched underpetticoats – she adds generously 'and whatever else thats wanting to furnish her a Room to live in which I may have forgot'. She spares one line for her only son William without mentioning him by name: 'I hereby appoint my dear Son my Sole Executor'. Son William duly took up administration of the goods. It is at this point in time not known who made off with the stitched underpetticoats. Of their son William and his wife Sarah's children, his eldest son was the Reverend William Rugge, Rector of Buckland (16 May 1740 – 2 November 1786) who married Lucy Henrietta French (d.1823), his second son was the Reverend Charles Rugge (1742–1773), Clerk of Storrington in Sussex, his eldest daughter Sarah was a witness at her sister Mary's wedding on 16 December 1773 at St. James's Church, Piccadilly, while his youngest daughter Mary Rugge (1752 – 22 February 1838) married Sir Charles Price, 1st Baronet (1747 – 1818), merchant in the City of London, shipowner, Lord Mayor of London and politician, and through that they were the ancestors of the Price, later Rugge-Price baronets, of Spring Grove. His second marriage to Anne Clarke (1703–1769), daughter of Sir James Clarke and widow of Samuel Sheppard (d.1760), appears to have been childless. The two were married on 1 September 1763 at Blisworth, Northamptonshire, England.
 Alice (1672 –  17 November 1724), m. John Ball (d. 5 January 1732), of Hampton Court, Auditor to Prince George of Denmark, 2dW, on 8 April 1706 at St. Stephen Walbrok, City of London. John Ball was the son of Anne Wren, the sister of Susan. His first wife had been another cousin, Frances Watts, the daughter of Edward Watts and Mary Wren, the sister of Susan and Anne, all three of them daughters of Matthew Wren, Bishop of Ely. By his first wife Frances, he had a son called Francis. His will mentions his sons John, George and Francis, and his grandchildren George and Anna Maria Ball.

By his third wife, Anne Scroggs (d.1713), he had:

 William Wright, (b.bef.1683). William is mentioned in both the will of his maternal grandfather, Sir William Scroggs (d.1683), and the will of his maternal grandmother, Anne Fettyplace, Lady Scroggs (d.1689). On 26 March 1713, when his mother wrote her will, he was in the Kingdom of Ireland, was married, and had a small son Robert, who was at school at Moulton in Lincolnshire. Sir Robert Wright's widow Anne was then living in the Parish of St. Andrew Holborn, Middlesex. She gives to her servant Anne Boyn her scrutoe (scrutore, a writing desk or cabinet, from French escritoire) and her chest of drawers, all of her own wearing apparel both woollen, linen and otherwise, and her own feather bed with the pillows for her great care to me in my Sickness

References

Attribution

1630s births
1689 deaths
Lord chief justices of England and Wales
Justices of the King's Bench
Alumni of Peterhouse, Cambridge
Members of Lincoln's Inn
English MPs 1661–1679
Year of birth uncertain
Barons of the Exchequer